"Young Cardinals" is the first single from Alexisonfire's fourth studio album, Old Crows / Young Cardinals.

The song was first played on the radio on April 20, 2009 and premiered on imeem on April 22. As of April 24, "Young Cardinals" has been streaming on Alexisonfire's MySpace page. The song was officially released on May 12, 2009. A music video was shot for "Young Cardinals" on May 2, 2009, on board the Maid of the Mist in Niagara Falls, Canada and premiered on MOD on May 15.

The song is also available for download on the music video game Guitar Hero World Tour and is featured in EA Sports NHL 10.

Personnel
 George Pettit – lead vocals
 Dallas Green – rhythm guitar, vocals
 Wade MacNeil – lead guitar, backing vocals
 Chris Steele – bass guitar
 Jordan Hastings – drums, percussion

Charts

Certifications

References

2009 singles
2009 songs
Alexisonfire songs
Vagrant Records singles